Zachry is an English language surname. It is derived from the Hebrew name Zechariah, which means "God remembers." The name is linked to the male given name Zechariah – and can refer to:
H.B. Zachry (1901–1984), American businessman
Pat Zachry (1952), American former professional baseball pitcher

References 

English-language surnames
Surnames from given names